Take It & Shuvit is the debut studio album from the Malaysian rock band Pop Shuvit, released in 2002 by Positive Tone and EMI Music Malaysia. The album contains 11 songs and 4 outtakes and is the first and last album to feature former Poetic Ammo member, Point Blanc. The repackaged version of this album, Take It & Shuvit Again was released on December 20, 2003.

Background
The album consisting of 15 tracks, including 11 songs and 4 outtakes. It also includes a cover version of Kriss Kross’ 1992 single "Jump", which released as the band’s first single. Another single, "Skaters’ Anthem" was chosen as the theme song of the Summer X-Games and became one of the most downloaded local songs in Malaysian music history. Take It & Shuvit also became Pop Shuvit's first and last studio album to feature Point Blanc as the second lead vocalist, before leave the band to focus to his group, Poetic Ammo and later pursue his solo career. The album also marks Pop Shuvit's first collaboration with international acts. Slapshock, a Filipino rock band, featured in the song "Dog Eat Dog (Pinoy Metal Assault)". The album also was released in Japan in 2003 with different cover.

Track listing
All music composed by Pop Shuvit except where noted.

Personnel
 Point - vocals
 Moots! - vocals
 JD - guitars
 AJ - bass
 Rudy - drums
 DJ Uno - turntables

Release history

References

External links
 Take It & Shuvit at AllMusic

2002 debut albums
Pop Shuvit albums